The Producers Guild of America Award for Outstanding Producer of Live Entertainment & Talk Television is an annual award given by the Producers Guild of America since 2005. The award has gone through several category classifications since its inception. At its start, the award was called the Television Producer of the Year Award in Variety Television, before transitioning to Outstanding Producer of Live Entertainment & Competition Television in 2008, until its current title was introduced in 2012.

Winners and nominations

2000s
Outstanding Producer of Variety Television

Outstanding Producer of Live Entertainment & Competition Television

References

Live Entertainment & Talk TV